Taizhou (Taichow) may refer to either of two cities in eastern China:

See also
 Táozhōu, Lintan County, Gansu Province
 Taizhou Airport (disambiguation)